The second LG Cup is an exhibition association football tournament that took place in Iran.

Participants

The participants were:

Venues

Results

Semifinals

Third place match

Final

Top scorers
2 goals
  Gjorgji Hristov
1 goal
  György Korsós
  Béla Illés
  Mohammad Khakpour
  Paul Hall

See also
LG Cup

References

International association football competitions hosted by Iran